The Corporate Insolvency and Governance Act 2020 (c. 12) is an act of the Parliament of the United Kingdom relating to companies and other entities in financial difficulty, and which makes temporary changes to laws relating to the governance and regulation of companies and other entities.

The bill was introduced as part of the government response to the COVID-19 pandemic in the United Kingdom and the primary intentions of the bill were to:
 introduce new corporate restructuring tools to the insolvency and restructuring regime to give companies the breathing space and tools required to maximise their chance of survival
 temporarily suspend parts of insolvency law to support directors to continue trading through the emergency without the threat of personal liability for wrongful trading and to protect companies from creditor action, and
 amend Company Law and other legislation to provide companies and other bodies with temporary easements on company filing and annual general meetings
The act commenced on 26 June 2020. It was amended by Statutory Instrument on 29 September 2020, to further extend certain time periods.

Main provisions

Moratoriums

Sections 1 to 6 and Schedules 1 to 8 amended the Insolvency Act 1986 to provide for a moratorium for companies that are likely to become insolvent. The moratorium would allow insolvent companies or companies that are likely to become insolvent to obtain a 20 business day period in which they could seek to restructure or seek investment without creditor actions. This period may be extended by a further 20 days. The company's affairs must be monitored by a qualified insolvency practitioner during the moratorium period.

Arrangement and reconstructions
Section 7 and Schedule 9 amend the Companies Act 2006 to insert a new part into that act which will allow for companies in financial difficulty, or which are likely to encounter financial difficulties, to propose a restructuring plan which allows into to compromise certain creditors or shareholders.

The restructuring plans introduced under this section are modelled to the existing scheme or arrangement provisions but with the addition of the ability to cram down across classes of creditors.

Sales to connected persons
Certain provisions in the Insolvency Act 1986 which allowed for regulations to be made to prohibit or restrict the sale of company property by an administrator to a person connected to the company. These provisions were due to expire in May 2020 and were extended to June 2021.

Winding-up petitions
Sections 10 and 11 and Schedules 10 and 11 provide temporary provisions to restrict statutory demands and winding up petitions issued against companies during the COVID-19 pandemic in the United Kingdom. This provision will prevent such petitions being made until 30 September 2020 where the company is in financial difficulty as a result of the COVID-19 pandemic.

Wrongful trading
Sections 12 and 13 temporarily suspend the liability for wrongful trading for company directors by assuming that any worsening of the directors are not responsible for a worsening of the financial position of a company during the pandemic. These provisions do not apply to certain financial institutions and does not relax other offences that may arise under the Insolvency Act 1986 or the general duties of directors under the Companies Act 2006.

Termination clauses
Section 14 amends the Insolvency Act 1986 to prevent suppliers from terminating contracts where a company enters into insolvency proceedings, for breaches that occur prior to insolvency or make it a condition of future supplies that pre-insolvency arrears are paid. Exclusions were made from this provision where the contract would cause the supplier hardship, for certain small suppliers and a number of further exclusions were made in respect of certain entities, industries and types of supply as a new schedule to the Insolvency Act 1986.

Powers to amend insolvency legislation
Sections 20 to 27 gave further powers to the Secretary for State to make regulations to amend corporate insolvency or governance legislation. The powers given were limited to changes to the conditions that must be met before insolvency, changing the way in which the insolvency procedures applies and to change the duties of periods with corporate responsibility. Such provisions may only be used where such provisions are urgent and proportionate, cannot have effect for more than 12 months and cannot be made after 30 April 2021.

Meetings and filings
Section 37  and Schedule 14 provided for relaxations to the rules applying to requirement for companies to hold meetings during the pandemic to take account of lockdown and social distancing measures. The rules provide that shareholder meetings  may be held electronically and voting at such meetings may be held electronically. The provisions apply to meetings that would otherwise be required to be held between 26 March 2020 and 30 September 2020. It also allows for companies to extend the period in which to hold an annual general meeting and an extension for the period in which public companies must file their financial statements.

Powers to change periods
Sections 41 and 42 gave powers to the Secretary for State to curtail the temporary time provisions which apply to parts of the act or to extend such periods for up to 6 months.

Extension of certain provisions

Extensions made in September 2020
The Corporate Insolvency and Governance Act 2020 (Coronavirus) (Extension of the Relevant Period) Regulations 2020 (SI 2020/1031) extended the following periods:
 In relation to the relaxations of AGM requirements, to 30 December 2020;
 In relation to the restrictions on use of statutory demands and winding up petitions, to 31 December 2020;
 In relation to modifications to the moratorium provisions and temporary moratorium clauses, to 30 March 2020; and
 In relation to the small supplier exemption from termination cause provisions, to 30 March 2021.
The SI was enacted by Lord Callanan for the Department for Business, Energy and Industrial Strategy.

The above extensions were subsequently modified by The Corporate Insolvency and Governance Act 2020 (Coronavirus) (Early Termination of Certain Temporary Provisions) Regulations 2020 (SI 2020/1033) in respect of the application of the moratorium provisions. These regulation provided that, from 1 October 2020,  an insolvency practitioner would no longer be able to disregard the impact of coronavirus on an company when considering whether the company is 'rescuable'.

Further extensions made in December 2020
The Corporate Insolvency and Governance Act 2020 (Coronavirus) (Extension of the Relevant Period) (No. 2) Regulations 2020 (SI 2020/1483) was introduced to parliament on 9 December 2020 and further extended the periods above in relation to winding up petitions and the use of statutory demands to 31 March 2021.

Passage through Parliament
The bill was introduced to the House of Commons by Alok Sharma, Secretary of State for Business, Energy and Industrial Strategy on 20 May 2020. Royal Assent of the act was granted on 25 June 2020.

See also
 UK insolvency law
 UK company law
 UK labour law
 Insolvency Act 1986
 Companies Act 2006
 COVID-19 pandemic in the United Kingdom
 COVID-19 recession

References

External links
 Guidance on effects of the Act – Companies House, 26 June 2020

COVID-19 pandemic in the United Kingdom
2020 in British law
United Kingdom Acts of Parliament 2020
Corporate law
Insolvency law of the United Kingdom
Law associated with the COVID-19 pandemic in the United Kingdom